Hubert Falco (born 15 May 1947 in Pignans, Var) is a French politician who has been appointed Secretary of State for development of the territory in the government of François Fillon on 18 March 2008. He is the mayor of Toulon.

References

Biography at nouveleconomiste.fr

1947 births
Living people
People from Var (department)
French people of Italian descent
Liberal Democracy (France) politicians
Union for French Democracy politicians
Union for a Popular Movement politicians
The Republicans (France) politicians
Politicians of the French Fifth Republic
Mayors of Toulon
Senators of Var (department)
Horizons politicians